NGC 3845 is a barred lenticular galaxy located about 270 million light-years away in the constellation Leo. NGC 3845 was discovered by astronomer John Herschel on March 17, 1831. It is a member of the Leo Cluster and is likely to be a low-luminosity AGN (LLAGN).

See also
 List of NGC objects (3001–4000)
 NGC 4340

References

External links
 

3845
36470
Leo (constellation)
Leo Cluster
Barred lenticular galaxies
Astronomical objects discovered in 1831
Active galaxies